Papamoa Plaza, formerly Palm Beach Plaza is a shopping complex in Papamoa, Tauranga, New Zealand opened in 1997. It has an immediate catchment of 17,000 people; this rises to over 200,000 people in the summer holidays. There are 37 stores in the Plaza.

History 
The plaza opened as Palm Beach Plaza in 1997. On 5 November 2002, part of the mall was devastated by a fire that started in Shane Punjab Restaurant. Three stores were gutted, and three others were damaged. The fire caused hundreds of thousands of dollars worth of damage. At 5am on 12 March 2006, a fire broke out in the 'Fresh Fish Market' store. The mall had installed automatic alarms since the 2002 fire, which allowed the fire to be dealt with quicker.

On 16 June 2006, the Papamoa Library and Community Centre opened adjacent to the Plaza. The 975sqm building cost $9.1 million to build.

Palm Beach Plaza was rebranded as Papamoa Plaza.

In 2016, the plaza was undergoing a $20 million upgrade that was expected to enlarge it to 50 or 60 stores by the end of 2018.

Location

Papamoa Plaza is located on the corner of Gravatt Road and Domain Road in Papamoa. There is road access to the shopping centre from both of these roads. On Gravatt Road, the shopping centre is adjacent to the Papamoa Library and is opposite another shopping centre (Fashion Island).

A market used to be held on the grass next to the Plaza on the second and fourth Sunday of every month, run by the Papamoa Lions Club, but stopped operating in September 2014 due to redevelopment at the Plaza. Market organisers were given notice until the end of February 2015 to re-locate due to the centre's redevelopment.

References

External links
 Papamoa Plaza's official website

Buildings and structures in Tauranga
Shopping centres in New Zealand
Shopping centres in the Bay of Plenty Region
Shopping malls established in 1997
1990s architecture in New Zealand